Giuseppe Ferrandino may refer to:

 Giuseppe Ferrandino (politician) 
 Giuseppe Ferrandino (writer)